Labou is a 2008 American independent adventure film written and directed by Greg Aronowitz, based on a story by Aronowitz and producer Sheri Bryant. It was released by MGM on May 19, 2009. Greg Aronowitz was heavily involved with Power Rangers S.P.D. and directed many of the episodes. Many of the same actors that appeared in that season of Power Rangers are also seen in Labou, including Chris Violette, Kelson Henderson, Barnie Duncan and Monica May. The film has received three prestigious awards including Best of Fest at the Chicago International Children's Film Festival, Best Family Feature at WorldFest 2008 Houston, and Best Feature at Bam Kids Film Festival in NY; and has also been approved by the Dove Foundation, KidsFirst!, and NAPPA.

Production was interrupted by Hurricane Katrina, forcing the cast and crew to abandon production and return early 2006.  The film has a dedication at the end to the people of New Orleans.

New Orleans Mayor Ray Nagin stars in Labou as the Mayor of New Orleans. Local jazz legend Ellis Marsalis plays the wise "Jazz Man" in the picture.

Drew Struzan designed the film's poster and the website was created by Ian J. Duncan.

Plot summary
Three unlikely friends set out on a journey to find the dreaded Ghost of Captain LeRouge whose treasure laden ship was lost in the Louisiana bayou over two hundred years ago. What they find is an adventure beyond their wildest imagination and the magical swamp creature "Labou" whose whistles are rumored to be the original inspiration for jazz.

With the help of Labou, the kids race to stay one step ahead of two crazy oil tycoons and discover the long lost treasure in time to save the swamps from destruction.

Cast
Bryan James Kitto as Toddster 
Marissa Cuevas as Emily Ryan
Darnell Hamilton as Gavin Thomson
Chris Violette as Reggie
Earl J Scioneaux Jr. as Ronald
Monica May as Librarian
Kelson Henderson as Clayton
Barnie Duncan as Captain Lerouge

References

External links
 

2008 films
2008 independent films
2000s children's adventure films
American children's adventure films
American independent films
American teen films
Films scored by Nathan Wang
Films set in Louisiana
Metro-Goldwyn-Mayer films
Pirate films
Treasure hunt films
2000s English-language films
2000s American films